Nemespátró is a village in Zala County, Hungary. Here lived the Slovene poet Balázs Berke.

References

Populated places in Zala County